Villanueva de las Cruces is a town and municipality located in the province of Huelva, Spain. According to the 2007 census, the municipality had a population of 416 inhabitants.

References

Municipalities in the Province of Huelva